Charles Augustus Crow (March 31, 1873 – March 20, 1938) was a U.S. Representative from Missouri.

Born on a farm near Sikeston, Missouri, Crow attended the common schools.
He moved to a farm near Bernie, Missouri, in August 1896 and engaged in agricultural pursuits.
He moved to Caruthersville, Pemiscot County, in 1901 and engaged in the real estate and insurance business. He was postmaster of Caruthersville from May 19, 1902, to January 14, 1909.

Crow was elected as a Republican to the Sixty-first Congress (March 4, 1909 – March 3, 1911).
He was an unsuccessful candidate for reelection in 1910 to the Sixty-second Congress.
He moved to Campbell, Missouri, in 1911 and resumed agricultural pursuits.
He also engaged in the real estate and insurance business.
He died in Campbell, Missouri, March 20, 1938, 11 days shy of his 65th birthday.
He was interred in Woodlawn Cemetery.

He is one of singer Sheryl Crow's great-grandfathers.

References

1873 births
1938 deaths
People from Sikeston, Missouri
Republican Party members of the United States House of Representatives from Missouri
People from Stoddard County, Missouri
People from Campbell, Missouri
Sheryl Crow